The Reform Party of the United States of America held primary elections for its presidential candidate in May 2004. Ralph Nader was overwhelmingly endorsed as candidate.

For a time, it seemed as though industrialist Ted Weill, among the party's most widely respected members, would become the front-runner for the nomination. When he learned that Ralph Nader would also seek the party's nomination, he dropped out of the race and endorsed Nader's candidacy. He ultimately contributed  thousands of dollars to Nader's  political campaigns. During his acceptance speech at the 2004 Reform Party National Convention in 
Irving, Texas, Nader thanked Weill for his support.

Candidates

Nominee
Consumer Advocate Ralph Nader of Connecticut

Withdrew during primary elections
Businessperson Ted Weill of Mississippi

Engineer Alan Banethuelos Sr of North Dakota (1.7%)

Declined to run
Activist Lenora Fulani of New York

References

Reform Party of the United States of America presidential primaries
Reform